Fort Johnson is a state-owned historic site of military and political significance located on the northeast point of James Island in Charleston County, South Carolina.

History 
Fort Johnson was strategically important during the colonial era, as it was located on the banks of the Ashley River. The fort was named after Sir Nathaniel Johnson, who served as the Governor of Carolina from 1703 to 1709. It was the site of the first raising of the South Carolina state flag in 1775. The magazine was built in 1765 and is a brick structure that measures 27 feet long and 20 feet wide. It was buried during the American Civil War by Confederate soldiers, and uncovered in 1931.

Fort Johnson and the magazine were listed on the National Register of Historic Places in 1972.

References 

 
1704 establishments in South Carolina
Johnson (South Carolina)
Johnson (South Carolina)
Archaeological sites on the National Register of Historic Places in South Carolina
Buildings and structures on the Ashley River (South Carolina)
Buildings and structures in Charleston County, South Carolina
Charleston Harbor
Johnson (South Carolina)

Johnson (South Carolina)
James Island, South Carolina
Johnson (South Carolina)
Johnson (South Carolina)
National Register of Historic Places in Charleston County, South Carolina
Protected areas of Charleston County, South Carolina
South Carolina in the American Civil War
South Carolina in the American Revolution
Johnson